Bansdih is a constituency of the Uttar Pradesh Legislative Assembly covering the city of Bansdih in the Ballia district of Uttar Pradesh, India. It is one of five assembly constituencies in the Salempur Lok Sabha constituency. Since 2008, this assembly constituency is numbered 362 amongst 403 constituencies.

Election results

2022

2017
Samajwadi Party member Ram Govind Chaudhary was the MLA, who won in the 2017 Uttar Pradesh Legislative Assembly election defeating Independent candidate Ketakee Singh by a margin of 1,687 votes.

Members of Legislative Assembly

References

External links
 

Assembly constituencies of Uttar Pradesh